Móstoles is a municipality of Spain located in the Community of Madrid. With over 200,000 inhabitants, it is the region's second most populated municipality after Madrid. Móstoles was a small town for a long time, but expanded rapidly in the second half of the 20th century.

The city also hosts the main campus of the Rey Juan Carlos University.

Geography

The municipality presents a largely flat relief. The main hydrographic features are the Guadarrama river at the western end of the municipality and several of the latter's left bank tributary creeks, including the Arroyo del Soto and the Arroyo de los Combos.

It lies at 660 metres above sea level.

History
Human beings have been present since the Paleolithic. Evidence of that fact are sites in which there are flint gravel and arrow tips.

Some traces of presence of Roman civilisation occur in the current municipality, specifically of the late period. They mainly consist of ceramic remains.

There is no evidence of a town in the current Móstoles during the Islamic rule era in Iberian Peninsula. However, there are some remains of this era in the territory.

It was founded most probably circa 1085–1137, after the Christian conquest of the Kingdom of Toledo (1085) as it was not mentioned in the chronicles compiling the villages seized in the conquest. Written mentions to the village in the Middle Ages, since its foundation up to the late-15th century are limited. By the beginning of the 16th century, it was part of the Land of Toledo.

On 6 December 1565, Philip II issued a royal cédula granting Móstoles the independence from Toledo, becoming a town (villa) under  (directly owned by the monarch).

Móstoles became famous as, although it was only a small town, its municipal authorities called for a general rebellion against the French forces on 2 May 1808 immediately after the Dos de Mayo Uprising in the Spanish capital, reportedly issuing the following public announcement (bando) signed by the Mayor: "The homeland is in danger. Madrid is perishing, victim of the French perfidiousness. Spaniards, turn to save her".

The municipality experienced a slow and steady population growth during the first half of the 20th century, followed by a huge demographic expansion from the 1960s onwards.

Human geography and administration 
There are two main localities: Móstoles, which is placed in the east of the municipality, and Parque-Coimbra, which is located in the southwest. The city had a population of 209,184 in 2019 and Parque-Coimbra is home to 10,747 people.

Some neighbourhoods are acknowledged by the town council and other by the autonoumous community (region) of Madrid. However, very few are recognised by the Spanish Statistics Institute such as Pinares Llanos and Parque Guadarrama.

According to the town council, the neighbourhoods are El Soto, Villaeuropa, Pinares Llanos, Azorín, San Fernando and Soto Vicente. All are located in the south or west. According to Comunidad de Madrid, the neighbourhoods are Los Rosales and Estoril II, which are placed in the north; Móstoles Central and Estoril, which are located in the northwest; Pradillo, which occurs in the centre; Villafontana, which is placed in the east; Versalles, which is located in the southeast; La Barra and Manuela Malasaña, which occur in the south; Las Cumbres and Coveta, which are located in the west; and El Soto, which occurs in the northwest.

The administrative division of the municipality are the disctrits and there are 5, which are:

 District 1 - Centro
 District 2 - Norte-Universidad
 District 3 - Sur-Este
 District 4 - Sur-Oeste
 District 5 - Parque Coimbra-Colonia Guadarrama

Economy 
Agriculture and animal husbandry are hardly performed in the municipality. Only a 0.2% of the GDP was collected from these activities in 2019. Mining, and industry activities equal 9.14% of that economic phenomenon in the same year. Building activities made the 8.63% of the money related to that economic measure. 11.9% of the registers of working people to an organism of the Welfare System in Spain named Tesorería General de la Seguridad Social, were due to posts in this sector.

The industrial estates in the municipality are Polígono Industrial El Lucero, in the northeast end; Polígono Industrial Los Rosales, in the northeast end; Prado Regordoño and Polígono Industrial la, in the east end; and Arroyomolinos, in the southern half.

Healthcare 
The municipality is home to a centro de salud in Parque Coimbra (primary care centre), 8 centros de salud in the main city, and two hospitals in the main locality.

Education 
Besides the university campus there are 34 public early childhood and primary education centres (CEIP) and 17 public secondary education centres (IES). 4 concertados (semiprivate or quasiprivate) centres are also located in the municipality. A centre for vocational education (CIFP) can also be found in Móstoles.

The campus includes the Higher School of Experimental Sciences and Technology, where people can choose among 13 degrees and 8 double degrees; the Higher Technical school of Computer Engineering, which includes 6 degrees and 6 double degrees; and the Faculty of social and legal sciences, where there are 9 degrees and 7 double degrees.

An adult education centre and a centre of the national language teaching institution are also located in the municipality.

Main sights

Historical landmarks

Two of the most architectural landmarks in Móstoles are churches; the church of La Asunción de Nuestra Señora (whose construction dates back to the 13th century) features a Mudéjar apse.
The Baroque hermitage of La Virgen de los Santos dates from the 17th century.

There is a sculpture by Aurelio Carretero paying homage to Andrés Torrejón inaugurated in 1908 to mark the one hundredth anniversary of the Dos de Mayo uprising.

Museums and galleries

Móstoles is the home of the Community of Madrid's modern art gallery, the Centro de Arte Dos de Mayo (CA2M). It was opened in 2008 to mark the two hundredth anniversary of the Dos de Mayo uprising.

The residence of Andrés Torrejón was rehabilitated by the city council and turned into a museum.

Transportation

Móstoles is connected to other suburbs and to central Madrid by:
 several major freeways (A-5 (Madrid-Badajoz-Lisbon), M-50) and toll highways (R-5).
 local and regional bus lines
 the Metrosur line (line 12, Madrid Metro)
 a commuter train line (line C-5, Cercanías Madrid) which has a terminus in Móstoles.

Walking and cycling
There is cycling infrastructure (Spanish: aceras bici, "bike-sidewalks") within central Móstoles. Funds were made available in 2017 to upgrade these cycleways.

It is also possible to cycle into the nearby countryside. The railway line originally continued to Almorox, but the section beyond Móstoles was closed in the 1960s. Between Móstoles-El Soto railway station and Navalcarnero the track has been converted into a greenway (via verde) for cyclists and walkers. The route crosses the river Guadarrama on an iron bridge.
The via verde connects to a waymarked long-distance walk to Guadalupe in Extremadura. The waymarking is recent, but it marks a traditional route from Madrid to the Our Lady of Guadalupe pilgrimage site.

Festivities 

 2nd of May: The origin of this celebration is in a historic event in which the locals rebelled against the French invaders. Some activities that are performed during the festive period are a parade with Gigantes and Cabezudos, a mass dedicated to the majors which ruled during the uprising period, a performance about the historic event, violin concerts, piano concerts, a rhythmic gymnastics exhibition, pétanque tournaments, an artistic roller skating tournament, mus tournaments and cuatrola (card game) tournaments.
 Patron saint festivities: They are held in the second third of September. The origin consists in a consecration to the Virgin de los Santos (in a facet in which she's related to the saints). Locals perform activities such as flowers places to Virgin statues as an offering symbol, a Gigantes and Cabezudos parade, an opening address, cows encloses and let loose actions and concerts. 
The following festivities are also held in Spain generally:

 Carnival: This festivity usually takes place during the second quarter of February. As typically in this festive event, parades and dances are perform in Móstoles during this period. There are also an opening address; some pasacalles, which are similar to standard parades; contests about carnival troupes, and chirigotas performances.
 Christmas: From early December to Epiphany Day, several activities are performed such as an event with illuminated objects, an illuminated pasacalles, a nativity scene settlement, a Three Kings’ parade, and sports activities such as a basketball tournament, a rhythmic gymnastics exhibition, a volleyball tournament, a golf tournament, swimming competitions, artistic roller skate competitions and footsal tournaments.

Sport
Ciudad de Móstoles FS
Estadio El Soto
CD Móstoles
CD Móstoles URJC
FS Móstoles
Móstoles CF

Notable people
Iker Casillas, former professional goalkeeper, who played for Real Madrid, F.C. Porto and the Spain national football team.
Rubén de la Red, footballer
Alberto Lora, footballer
Rafael Martínez, gymnast
Christian Gálvez, actor and TV presenter
Raúl Arévalo, actor
Rubén Belima, footballer
Las Supremas de Móstoles, a popular singing pop band made up of three sisters

See also
Hermitage of Nuestra Señora de los Santos, cultural heritage hermitage

References
Citations

Bibliography

External links

Ayuntamiento de Móstoles

 
Municipalities in the Community of Madrid